Stefanos Tsitsipas was the defending champion, but chose not to defend his title.

Denis Shapovalov won his first ATP Tour singles title, defeating Filip Krajinović in the final, 6–4, 6–4.

Former world No. 8 Janko Tipsarević played his last ATP match at the tournament losing in the quarterfinals to Yūichi Sugita.

Seeds
The top four seeds receive a bye into the second round.

Draw

Finals

Top half

Bottom half

Qualifying

Seeds

Qualifiers

Lucky losers

Qualifying draw

First qualifier

Second qualifier

Third qualifier

Fourth qualifier

References

External links
 Main draw
 Qualifying draw

2019 ATP Tour
Singles